Man Afraid is a 1957 American film noir directed by Harry Keller and starring George Nader, Phyllis Thaxter and Tim Hovey.

Plot
A minister (George Nader) accidentally kills a young burglar. The father of the burglar (Eduard Franz) sets out to revenge his son's death by threatening the minister's son.

Cast
 George Nader as Rev. David Collins
 Phyllis Thaxter as Lisa Collins
 Tim Hovey as Michael Collins
 Eduard Franz as Carl Simmons
 Harold J. Stone as Lieutenant Marlin
 Judson Pratt as Wilbur Fletcher
 Reta Shaw as Nurse Willis
 Tom Nolan as Ronnie 'Skunky' Fletcher 
 Mabel Albertson as Maggie
 Martin Milner as Shep Hamilton
Troy Donahue as reporter

See also
 List of American films of 1957

External links
 
 

1957 films
Film noir
1950s thriller films
American thriller films
American black-and-white films
Films scored by Henry Mancini
Universal Pictures films
Films directed by Harry Keller
1950s English-language films
1950s American films